The R300 is a graphics chip.

R300 may also refer to:
 R300 (South Africa), a highway near Cape Town 
 R300 road (Ireland)
 R-300, a version of the Scud missile